Antonio Vasconcelos Rueda (born 21 August 1970) is a Mexican politician affiliated with the National Action Party. As of 2014 he served as Deputy of the LX Legislature of the Mexican Congress representing Puebla.

References

1970 births
Living people
People from Puebla
National Action Party (Mexico) politicians
21st-century Mexican politicians
Deputies of the LX Legislature of Mexico
Members of the Chamber of Deputies (Mexico) for Puebla